George Howard Ittleman (March 15, 1881 – June 1974) was an American lawyer and  politician from New York.

Life
He was born on March 15, 1881, in the Russian Empire. The family emigrated to the United States, and in 1892 settled in Brooklyn. He attended Boys High School. He graduated LL.B. from Columbia Law School in 1903, was admitted to the bar in 1904, and practiced law in Brooklyn.

In November 1913, he was elected as a Progressive, with Republican and Independence League endorsement, to the New York State Assembly (Kings Co., 6th D.), and was a member of the 137th New York State Legislature in 1914. In November 1914, he ran for re-election, but was defeated by Republican Nathan D. Shapiro.

In 1945, Ittleman headed a committee which supported Magistrate Abner C. Surpless to run for the Republican nomination for Mayor of New York City, but after five months of debate Surpless withdrew from the race in June.

Ittleman died in June 1974.

References

1881 births
1974 deaths
Politicians from Brooklyn
Members of the New York State Assembly
New York (state) Progressives (1912)
20th-century American politicians
Emigrants from the Russian Empire to the United States
Columbia Law School alumni
Boys High School (Brooklyn) alumni